The Lariang River is a river in Sulawesi, Indonesia.

Course
The river, as the Lariang, goes on to form part of the border between Central Sulawesi and West Sulawesi and enters the Macassar Strait just past the town of Lariang.

See also
List of rivers of Indonesia
List of rivers of Sulawesi

References

Rivers of Central Sulawesi
Rivers of West Sulawesi
Rivers of Indonesia